Canada is a federation that comprises ten provinces and three territories. Its government is structured as a parliamentary democracy, with a Prime Minister as its head of government; and a constitutional monarchy, with King Charles III as its sovereign. Each of the country's provinces and territories has a head of government, called premier in English and —the same term used for the federal leader—in French. Collectively, the federal Prime Minister and provincial and territorial premiers are referred to as first ministers.
 
The longest-serving current first minister is Prime Minister Justin Trudeau, who assumed office on November 4, 2015; the newest first minister is Ranj Pillai of Yukon, who assumed office on January 14, 2023. Of the current first ministers, three (Caroline Cochrane of the Northwest Territories, Danielle Smith of Alberta, and Heather Stefanson of Manitoba) are women and two (P.J. Akeeagok of Nunavut and Caroline Cochrane of the Northwest Territories) are Indigenous.

Of the current first ministers, three are from a Liberal Party, five are from a Progressive Conservative Party, and one is from a New Democratic Party - however, federal and provincial/territorial parties that share common names are not necessarily affiliated with or politically analogous to one another. Three other first ministers are from locally-branded parties (the Coalition Avenir Québec, the Saskatchewan Party, and the United Conservative Party) and two are non-partisan.

Current Canadian first ministers
Premiers are listed in accordance with the provincial order of precedence: provinces before territories, and by order of joining confederation within those categories; where multiple jurisdictions joined confederation in the same year, they are ordered by population at the time of joining.

See also
Lists of Canadian senators
Lists of members of the Canadian House of Commons
Timeline of Canadian elections
List of Asian-Canadian first ministers
List of female first ministers in Canada
Deputy Premier (Canada)
Premier (Canada)

Notes

References

External links
 Prime Minister of Canada

 current
First Ministers